The 1998–99 Midland Football Alliance season was the fifth in the history of Midland Football Alliance, a football competition in England.

Clubs and league table
The league featured 19 clubs from the previous season, along with one new club:
Stourport Swifts, promoted from the West Midlands (Regional) League

League table

References

External links
 Midland Football Alliance

1998-99
8